The UCLA Henry Samueli School of Engineering and Applied Science, informally known as UCLA Samueli School of Engineering or UCLA Engineering, is the school of engineering at the University of California, Los Angeles (UCLA). It opened as the College of Engineering in 1945 and was renamed the School of Engineering in 1969. Since its initial enrollment of 379 students, the school has grown to approximately 6,500 students. The school is ranked 16th among all engineering schools in the United States. The school offers 28 degree programs and is home to eight externally funded interdisciplinary research centers, including those in space exploration, wireless sensor systems, and nanotechnology.

History

The school was renamed for its alumnus and professor Henry Samueli, who received his B.S. (1975), M.S. (1976), and Ph.D. (1980) in Electrical Engineering there. Samueli is co-founder, chairman, and chief technology officer of Broadcom Corporation and a philanthropist in the Orange County community. He and his wife Susan donated $30 million to the school in 1999. It was at UCLA that Dr. Henry Nicholas and Dr. Henry Samueli met and later formed Broadcom.

The main building is Boelter Hall (Engineering II and III), named after Llewellyn M. K. Boelter, a Mechanical Engineering professor at UC Berkeley who became the first Dean of the school. He "often took an active role in the lives of the school's students, and his approach to engineering impacted many of their careers," according to the school. He retired in 1965 and was succeeded by Chauncey Starr, a pioneer in nuclear power development.

HSSEAS is housed in two other buildings: Engineering IV, and Engineering V, which houses the Department of Bioengineering and the Department of Materials Science and Engineering. Engineering I was demolished in August 2011, to be replaced by Engineering VI, which houses the Western Institute of Nanotechnology on Green Engineering and Metrology (WIN-GEM) in 2014. The ground breaking ceremony for Engineering VI building was held October 26, 2012 with Congressman Henry A. Waxman and Henry Samueli. On March 19, 2015, Engineering VI phase I was dedicated and phase II broke ground with the help of James L. Easton, class of '59 alumnus. Engineering VI was completed and opened in 2018.

The school is credited as the birthplace of the Internet, where the first message was sent to a computer at Stanford University on October 29, 1969, by Professor Leonard Kleinrock and his research team at UCLA. On September 29, 2008, President George W. Bush presented the 2007 National Medal of Science to Kleinrock for "his fundamental contributions to the mathematical theory of modern data networks, and for the functional specification of packet switching, which is the foundation of Internet technology. His mentoring of generations of students has led to the commercialization of technologies that have transformed the world." Room 3420 at Boelter Hall, where the first message was sent, has been converted into The Kleinrock Internet Heritage Site and Archive (renamed KIHC – The Kleinrock Internet History Center at UCLA).

UCLA conferred its first Bachelor of Science degree in engineering in 1947, its first Master of Science degree in 1948, and its first Doctor of Philosophy degree in 1950. Annual Engineering commencement ceremonies are held in June at Pauley Pavilion.

Departments and programs
The Samueli School of Engineering has seven departments and one interdepartmental program, which are accredited by the Accreditation Board for Engineering and Technology (ABET). The school offers the following degrees:

Online M.S. Degree
Graduate Certificate of Specialization

Undergraduate admissions
For Fall 2019, UCLA Engineering received 25,804 freshman applications and admitted 2,505 for an admission rate of 9.7%.

For Fall 2015 admitted students had a median weighted grade point average (GPA) of 4.5 and a median SAT score of 2190.

The breakdown of SAT scores by subject is as follows:

Median SAT Mathematics II score: 790

For Fall 2020, UCLA Engineering received 24,039 freshman applications and admitted 2,640 for an admission rate of 11.0%.

Admitted students had a median unweighted grade point average (GPA) of 4.00, a median weighted GPA of 4.59, and a median SAT score of 1540.

Enrollment (2018)

Graduate Enrollment: 2,503
M.S. Students: 1,386
Ph.D. Students: 1,117

Total HSSEAS Enrollment: 6,584

Alumni

Winners of the UCLA Engineering Alumni of the Year award 

Other notable alumni

 Allen Adham ’90: co-founder of Blizzard Entertainment
 Michael Morhaime ’90: co-founder of Blizzard Entertainment
 Frank Pearce ’90: co-founder of Blizzard Entertainment
 James Collins ’50: founder of Sizzler
 Chris “Jesus” Ferguson ’86, Ph.D. ’99: professional poker player
 Klein Gilhousen ’69: co-inventor of CDMA technology and co-founder of Qualcomm
 Blake Krikorian ’90: founder of Sling Media
 K. Megan McArthur, ’93: NASA astronaut
 James D. Plummer ’66, M.S. ’67, Ph.D. ’71: Dean of Stanford University School of Engineering

Deans
 Llewellyn M.K. Boelter, 1944-1965 
 Chauncey Starr, 1967-1973
 Russell R. O'Neill, 1974-1983
 George L. Turin, 1983-1986
 A.R. Frank Wazzan, 1986-2001
 Vijay K. Dhir, 2003 - 2015
 Jayathi Murthy 2016 - present

Faculty
Faculty members: 164

National Academy of Engineering members: 28

Faculty distinctions:

Research centers

Center for Cell Control (CCC)
Center for Domain Specific Computing (CDSC)
Center for Molecularly Engineered Energy Materials (MEEM)
Center for Nanoscience Innovation for Defense (CNID)
Smart Grid Energy Research Center (SMERC)
Western Institute of Nanoelectronics (WIN)
Center for Energy Science and Technology Advanced Research (CESTAR)
Center for Research in Engineering, Media, and Performance (REMAP)
California Nanosystems Institute (CNSI)
Center for Embedded Networked Sensing (CENS)
Center for High Frequency Electronics
Center for Information and Computation Security (CICS)
Center for Scalable and Integrated Nano-Manufacturing (SINAM)

Center for Systems, Dynamics and Controls (SyDyC)
Center for Materials Research in Art and Archaeology (CMRAA)
Water Technology Research Center (WaTeR)
Wireless Health Institute (WHI)
Flight Systems Research Center
Functional Engineered Nano Architectonics Center
Fusion Science and Technology Center
Institute for Cell Mimetic Space Exploration
Institute for the Risk Sciences (IRS)
Institute for Technology Advancement
Nanoelectronics Research Facility
Network for Earthquake Engineering Simulation
Southern California Particle Center and Supersite
Wireless Internet for Mobile Enterprise Consortium

See also
 History of the Internet
 University of California, Los Angeles

References

External links
UCLA Henry Samueli School of Engineering and Applied Science
KIHC – The Kleinrock Internet History Center at UCLA 
Enrollment and Degree Statistics
Samueli's biography at the UCLA Department of Electrical Engineering
The Samueli Foundation

University of California, Los Angeles schools
UCLA Henry
Engineering schools and colleges in the United States
Educational institutions established in 1945
1945 establishments in California
Samueli School of Engineering
Samueli School of Engineering
Samueli School of Engineering
History of the Internet